Helcystogramma perelegans is a moth in the family Gelechiidae. It was described by Natalia Viktorovna Omelko and Mikhail Mikhailovich Omelko in 1993. It is found in south-eastern Siberia, Korea, Japan and China (Hunan, Tianjin).

The wingspan is 10–11.5 mm. The forewings have dark silvery-grey markings with a purplish-blue metallic lustre.

References

Moths described in 1993
perelegans
Moths of Asia